Chamaesphecia alysoniformis is a moth of the family Sesiidae. It is found on the Balkan Peninsula, Cyprus and in Turkey.

The larvae feed on Mentha longifolia, Mentha spicata and Mentha pulegium.

References

Moths described in 1846
Sesiidae
Moths of Europe
Moths of Asia